Dregea sinensis     is a species of plant in the family Apocynaceae that is native to China.

References

External links
 
 

Asclepiadoideae
Plants described in 1889